Keywords are the words that academics use to reveal the internal structure of an author's 
reasoning.  While they are used primarily for rhetoric, they are also used in a strictly 
grammatical sense for structural composition, reasoning, and comprehension.  Indeed, they are 
an essential part of any language.

There are many different types of keyword categories including: Conclusion, Continuation, Contrast,
Emphasis, Evidence, Illustration and Sequence. Each category serves its own function, as do the keywords
inside of a given category.

When someone uses a search engine, they type in one or more words describing what they are looking for:
'Norwich florist' or 'cheap holidays Greece', for example. These words or phrases are known as keywords.

Corpus linguistic keywords
In corpus linguistics, key words are words that appear with statistically unusual frequency in a text
or a corpus of texts. They are identified by software that compares a word-list of the text with a word-list
based on a larger reference corpus. A suitable term for the phenomenon is keyness. The procedure used,
for example by WordSmith, to list key words and phrases and plot where they appear in texts. These items
are very often of interest—particularly those human readers would not likely notice, such as prepositions,
time adverbs, and pronouns.

Teaching Keywords
One method used to teach keywords is called the "keyword method." It involves taking complex keywords that students do not know very well, and makes them into easier words. The easier words must have something to do with the complex keywords so students can correlate between the two.

References

Scott, M. & Tribbe, C., 2006, Textual Patterns: keyword and corpus analysis in language education, Amsterdam: Benjamins.

External links
 Transitional Words and Phrases

Rhetoric